Rogelio Antonio Jr. (born February 19, 1962) is a Filipino chess grandmaster, who was awarded the title in 1993. He is affectionately known as "Joey" Antonio or GM Joey. Antonio finished tied for 3rd-8th places in the 2009 Asian Chess Championship (ultimately finishing in 6th place after tiebreaks) and became the first player in the Philippines' history to qualify for the World Cup later in 2009.

Chess career

FIDE World Chess Championship

Antonio participated in two World Chess Championship cycle, in the 1990-1993 cycle and the 1998-1999 cycle:

In the 1990-1993 cycle, he participated in the Zonal 11 tournament held at Shah Alam, Malaysia where he ended up as the best-placed Filipino player tied for 9th-13th places with fellow Filipinos GM Eugene Torre and then IM Rogelio Barcenilla and IM Edhi Handoko and GM Utut Adianto, both of Indonesia.  Antonio eventually ended up in 9th place with Handoko ending up 10th, Torre 11th, Barcenilla 12th and Adianto 13th.  He was seeded No. 8 in this tournament with an ELO of 2440 and registered 6.0/11 recording 3 wins, 6 draws and 2 losses with a Tournament Performance Rating (TPR) of 2465.  However, he did not qualify for the Interzonals as only the top 2 qualified.

In the 1998-1999 cycle, Antonio (2540) tied for 1st-4th places in the Zonal 3.2a held at Yangon in December 1998 with Super GM Adianto (2610), IM Dede Liu (2375) of Indonesia and FM Dashzeveg Sharavdorj (2385) of Mongolia that necessitated a play-off among the 4 players as all 4 scored 6.5/9 with Antonio posting 5 wins, 3 draws and 1 loss with a TPR of 2565 in the 30-player field.  In the ensuing playoff, Antonio came out on top with 4.0/6 (+2 =4 -0) as he qualified for the 1999 World Championship held at Las Vegas.  As the 63rd-ranked player with an ELO of 2558, he progressed into the Round of 64 as he defeated the 99th-seeded Alexander Kozak (2330) of Russia, 2–0, in the Round of 128.  However, he was defeated in the Round of 64 by Armenian Super GM Vladimir Akopian (2640), 2.5-1.5.  Their best-of 2 matches ended up tied 1-1 as both games ended in draws that necessitated tiebreaks.  After another draw in the first game of the 2-game tiebreaks, Antonio lost the second game as he bowed out of the World Chess Championship.

FIDE World Cup

Antonio also qualified in the 2009 Chess World Cup held in Khanty-Mansiysk, Russia held from November 20 - December 15, 1999 which is a knock-out format.  Antonio earned the berth after finishing tied for 3rd-8th places in the 2009 Asian Chess Championship also known as the Asian Continental Championship, eventually placing 6th.  The top 10 finishers in the tournament qualified for the Chess World Cup.

Seeded 102 among 128 players, Antonio (2574) faced 27th-seeded Super GM Gata Kamsky (2695) in the Round of 128.  He bowed to Kamsky, 0.5-1.5, after losing the first game and drawing the 2nd game.

Chess Olympiad

Antonio has played many times for the Philippines Olympiad team, mostly on board 2, behind the Philippines' first GM Torre. Antonio's tally in this arena has never fallen below 50% and in 2000, at Istanbul, he scored 7/10 with a performance rating of 2684.  He has already scored a high 74 points out of 117 games on the strength of 48 wins, 52 draws and 17 losses for a winning percentage of 63.2%.

{|class="wikitable" style="text-align: left;"
|-
! Event
! Board 
! ELO
! Record 
! Winning %
! Individual result 
! Rank
! TPR
! Team result
|-
|Olympiad, Thessaloniki 1988 || 4th || 2325 || +6 =5 -2  || 65.4% || 8.5/13 || 14th+ || 2544 || 7th 
|-
|Olympiad, Novi Sad 1990 || 2nd || 2445 || +7 =3 -3  || 65.4% || 8.5/13 || 14th+ || 2573 || 21st 
|-
|Olympiad, Msnila 1992 || 2nd || 2500 || +7 =2 -3  || 66.7% || 8.0/12 || 10th || 2499 || 31st 
|-
|Olympiad, Moscow 1994 || 2nd || 2490 || +4 =6 -2  || 58.3% || 7.0/12 || 34th || 2571 || 21st 
|-
|Olympiad, Yerevan 1996 || 2nd || 2530 || +4 =5 -4  || 50.0% || 6.5/13 || 46th || 2482 || 26th 
|-
|Olympiad, Elista 1998 || 2nd || 2540 || +2 =10 -0^  || 58.3% || 7/12 || 35th || 2596 || 35th 
|-
|Olympiad, Istanbul 2000 || 2nd || 2548 || +6 =2 -2  || 70.0% || 7.0/10 || 9th+ || 2684 || 19th 
|-
|Olympiad, Bled 2002 || 2nd || 2507 || +4 =8 -0^  || 66.7% || 8.0/12 || 12th || 2594 || 39th 
|-
|Olympiad, Calvia 2004 || 2nd || 2524 || +4 =5 -0^  || 72.2% || 6.5/9 || 6th+ || 2613 || 19th 
|-
|Olympiad, Turin 2006 || 3rd || 2539 || +4 =6 -1  || 63.6% || 7.0/11 || 27th || 2608 || 44th 
|} 
+ Team-best Rank

^ Unbeaten tournament

Asian Team Chess Championship

{|class="wikitable" style="text-align: left;"
|-
! Event
! Board 
! ELO
! Record 
! Winning %
! Individual result 
! Rank
! TPR
! Team result
|-
|Penang Asian Team Chess Championship (9th) 1991 || 1st || 2495 || +3 =6 -0  || 66.7% || 6/9 || 6th || 2492 || Silver 
|-
|Kuala Lumpur Asian Team Chess Championship (10th) 1993 || 2nd || 2485 || +4 =3 -1  || 68.8% || 5.5/8 || Silver || 2512 || Bronze 
|-
|Singapore Asian Team Chess Championship (11th) 1995 || 1st || 2525 || +5 =2 -1  || 75.0% || 6.0/8 || Gold || 2568 || Gold 
|-
|Shenyang Asian Team Chess Championship (12th) 1999 || 1st || 2558 || +2 =4 -3  || 44.4% || 4.0/9 || (9th) || 2443 || Fourth 
|}

He ended up his stint at the Asian Team Chess Championship with a record of 21.5 points in 34 games in 4 appearances posting 14 wins, 15 draws and 5 losses with a winning percentage of 63.2% winning 2 medals in the individual standings (1 gold and 1 silver) and 3 medals in the team competitions (1 gold, 1 silver and 1 bronze).

Asian Cities Chess Championship

{|class="wikitable" style="text-align: left;"
|-
! Event
! Board 
! ELO
! Record 
! Winning %
! Individual result 
! Rank
! TPR
! Team result
|-
|13th Asian Cities Chess Championship Aden 2002 || 2nd || 2519 || +4 =3 -2  || 61.1% || 5.5/9 || --- || 2426 || Bronze 
|-
|14th Asian Cities Chess Championship Manila 2004 || 2nd || 2523 || +4 =4 -1  || 66.7% || 6.0/9 || --- || 2469 || Gold 
|-
|15th Asian Cities Chess Championship Tehran 2007 || 2nd || 2551 || +5 =3 -1  || 72.2% || 6.5/9 || Silver || 2553 || Silver 
|-
|17th Asian Cities Chess Championship Jakarta 2011 || 2nd || 2589 || +6 =2 -1  || 77.8% || 7.0/9 || Silver || 2585 || Fourth 
|-
|18th Asian Cities Chess Championship Tagaytay 2013 || 1st || 2518 || +4 =1 -3  || 56.3% || 4.5/8 || --- || 2473 || Fourth 
|}

After the 2013 edition, his 5th participation in the tournament, Antonio has already compiled a total of 29.5 points in 44 games winning 23 games, drawing 13 matches and losing 8 games for a 67.0% winning rate.  He ended up with 2 silver medals in the individual competitions and 1 gold, 1 silver and 1 bronze in team competitions.

Asian Individual Chess Championship

{|class="wikitable" style="text-align: left;"
|-
! Event
! ELO Rating (Seed)
! Result
! Record
! Rank
! # of Players
! TPR
|-
|Kolkata Asian Chess Championship (3rd) 2001 || 2535 (18th) || 5.5/11 || +4 =3 -4 || 41st || 76 || 2422
|-
|Cebu City Asian Chess Championship (6th) 2007 || 2532 (19th) || 7.0/11 || +5 =4 -2 || 11th || 72 || 2593
|-
|Subic Bay Freeport Zone Asian Chess Championship (7th) 2009 || 2518 (28th) || 7.5/11 || +5 =5 -1 || 6th || 86 || 2628
|-
|Subic Bay Freeport Zone Asian Chess Championship (8th) 2010 || 2572 (14th) || 5.5/9 || +2 =7 -0 || 21st || 90 || 2514
|-
|Ho Chi Minh City Asian Chess Championship (10th) 2012 || 2557 (13th) || 0.5/3 || +0 =1 -2 || 72nd || 72 || 2128
|-
|Subic Bay Freeport Zone Asian Chess Championship (11th) 2013 || 2539 (15th) || 4.5/9 || +2 =5 -2 || 47th || 77 || 2355
|- 
|}

In six (6) appearances in the Asian Chess Championship, Antonio has already recorded 30.5 points in 54 games registering 18 wins, 25 draws and 11 losses for a 56.5 winning percentage.

Asian Games

Antonio (2573) was also part of the silver medal-winning Philippine Team to the 16th Asian Games held in Guangzhou, China where they stunned the highly rated all-Super GM Indian team led by GMs Krishnan Sasikiran (2688) and Pentala Harikrishna (2657) in the semifinals, 2.5-1.5, to advance to the gold medal game versus China.  He manned Board 2 where he played a total of 7 games, going undefeated with 5 points posting 3 wins and 4 draws for a 71.4% winning rate that included his great win against Sasikiran in the semifinals. He was the team's top scorer and had a very high TPR of 2730.

Asian Indoor Games

Antonio (2557) was also part of the Philippine Team that participated in the 3rd Asian Indoor Chess Games held at Hanoi, China in 2009 where he played Board 1.  After nine (9) rounds of preliminaries, the team placed 7th among 15 teams and failed to advance to the cross-over semifinals.  Antonio played all 8 games (the team had a bye in the 7th round) and scored 5 points (+4 =2 -2) for a winning rate of 62.5% although he had a rather low 2495 TPR and was the team's 2nd-leading scorer behind GM Mark Paragua (Board 2).

Other notable tournaments

Some of Antonio's best results include 3rd at the Manapla, Negros Occidental event in 2001, tied for 2nd-4th at the 15th Leuven Open 2003 and 2nd at the Malaysian Open of 2005. Also in 2005, he took a bronze medal at the blitz event of the South East Asian (SEA) Games and a board one gold medal at the National Open Team Championship for club side Tagaytay, with a score of 6/7.

At the 15th (2003) Leuven Open held from November 7–11, 2003 in Belgium and attracted 112 participants, Antonio (2522) ended up tied for 2nd-4th places with Super GM Vladimir Epishin of Russia and fellow GM Buenaventura Villamayor all with 7.0/9, 1 point behind sole winner GM Torre who scored 8.0/9.  Antonio eventually ended up in 3rd place after the Buchholz tiebreaks losing out to Epishin, 56–52, but ahead of Villamayor (51.5).  He had a TPR of 2529.

In 2013, Antonio proved that he is still a force to reckon with in chess as he won the 2013 National Rapid Chess Championship held at the Philippine Sports Commission (PSC) National Athletes' Dining Hall, Rizal Memorial Sports Complex, Vito Cruz, Manila.  He finished the 9-round Open Division with 7.5 points ahead of fellow GM Richard Bitoon of Cebu and NM Jerad Docena of Bohol who both ended up with 7.0 points.

On July 25, 2020, Antonio ruled the Baby Uno Chess Challenge dubbed as the Police Colonel Jaime Osit Santos Chess Championship where he scored 10.5/12 scoring 10 wins, 1 draw and 1 loss in this 12-round Swiss System tournament organized by the Bayanihan Chess Club headed by AGM/NM Almario Marlon Bernardino and Genghis Katipunan Memorial.  He finished 2.5 point clear of joint second placers FM Jesse Noel Salas, NM Julius Sinangote and US Master Jose Aquino Jr. who all ended up with 8.0 points.

2008 US Tournaments

In 2008, Antonio won seven straight US tournaments: (1) 2008 Super Blitz Open Chess Championships, (2) the 2008 Motor City Open, (3) the 17th North American FIDE Invitational, (4) the 2008 Los Angeles Open, (5) the 8th Universal Annual Swiss Chess Open, (6) the G/19 and the (7) 10th Annual Joseph Ileto Memorial Open Chess Championships.

Seniors Chess Championship

On November 18, 2017, Antonio placed second in the 27th World Senior Chess Championship 2017 held in Acqui Terme, Italy, in the Open 50+ category behind winner GM Julio Granda Zuniga of Peru.  He won his final round match against Italian IM Spartaco Sarno in 51 moves of a Caro-Kann defense to finish with 8.5 points in a tie with French GM Eric Prie.  Antonio claimed 2nd place by virtue of a better quotient, 73–71.5.  He also captured 3rd place in the blitz section with 7.0 points behind winner IM Alexander Reprintsev of Ukraine (8.5) and German Rolf Fritsch (8.0).

On July 21, 2020, Antonio won the 2020 Asian Seniors Chess Championship by scoring 7.5/9 ahead of Uzbek GMs Tair Vahidov, 2nd with 6.5/9, and Alexei Barsov, 3rd with 6.0/9.  Fellow Filipino IM Ricardo de Guzman led a group of 5.5 pointers.  Antonio was undefeated in the tournament registering 6 wins, including a big win against Vahidov in the 3rd round, and 3 draws, one of which was against Barsov in the 7th round.

References

Further reading

External links

Filipino chess players
Chess grandmasters
Living people
1962 births
Place of birth missing (living people)
Asian Games medalists in chess
Chess players at the 2010 Asian Games
Asian Games silver medalists for the Philippines
Medalists at the 2010 Asian Games
Southeast Asian Games silver medalists for the Philippines
Southeast Asian Games bronze medalists for the Philippines
Southeast Asian Games medalists in chess
Competitors at the 2005 Southeast Asian Games
20th-century Filipino people
21st-century Filipino people